The Life of Buddha (Prawat Phra Phuttajao, or simply The Buddha) is a 2007 Thai animated drama film about the life of Gautama Buddha, based on the Tripitaka. The film was released on December 5, 2007, in celebration of Thai King Bhumibol Adulyadej's 80th birthday.

Plot

Production
Production of the film started in 2004 as a personal project by Thai businesswoman Wallapa Phimtong, who was beset by financial difficulties and delays. Initially, Wallapa sought backing and expertise through a Thai government agency, but the funding never came through, and Wallapa become embroiled in a lawsuit over the production.

Wallapa continued with the financing of the film on her own, and at first estimated the cost of making the film at 50 million baht, but those costs doubled. She then sold off her cars, land and personal assets to make the film.

Wallapa said a businessman offered to buy the rights to film for 200 million baht but she refused the offer.

"My ultimate goal, after the film has been screened in theatres, is to distribute free copies to schools nationwide. If I sell the project to the firm, that won't be possible," she said in an interview.

Critical response
Bangkok Post film critic Kong Rithdee said The Buddha was well-meaning, but lacked depth and would appeal mainly to children. "[That] means that The Buddha mirrors the national climate of institutional worship and the indifference, if not the ignorance, to how modern society has twisted Lord Buddha's teachings into something much less pure than their original meanings."

A Pali scholar contributed a critique of the film to Prachatai, in equal parts excoriating and lamenting the film's lack of historical accuracy or even dramatic coherence.

See also
Depictions of Gautama Buddha in film
Angulimala (2003 film)
Buddha's Lost Children

References

External links
 
 
 The Buddha at SiamZone 

2007 films
Thai animated films
Thai-language films
Buddhism in Thailand
Films about Gautama Buddha
Buddhist animation
2007 animated films
Films set in India
2000s children's animated films
Thai children's films